Basdila is a village in district Basti (currently falling under Sant Kabir Nagar district) in Uttar Pradesh in North India.

Basdila is known for the Sunni Madrasa Darul uloom Ahle Sunnat established in the British Era, pre-independence India.  Darul Uloom is a government aided institute established around 1940, currently serving approximately 800 students. The foundation stone of this Madrasa was laid down by Master Inamullah Khan.

References

Villages in Sant Kabir Nagar district